Jonas Persson may refer to:
 Jonas Persson (swimmer) (born 1983), Swedish swimmer
 Jonas Persson (football executive), Swedish businessman
 Jonas Persson (cyclist) (1913–1986), Swedish cyclist